Haughley Road railway station was the original station serving Haughley, Suffolk. It closed in 1849 and was replaced by Haughley railway station which was positioned to serve both branches to the north of the newly constructed Haughley Junction. As in 2017 some or part of the station buildings still survive adjacent to Bacton Road bridge.

References 

Disused railway stations in Suffolk
Former Great Eastern Railway stations
Railway stations in Great Britain opened in 1846
Railway stations in Great Britain closed in 1849
1846 establishments in England